80 Minutes is a 2008 German direct-to-video English-language action thriller film written and directed by Thomas Jahn and starring Gabriel Mann, Natalia Avelon, Joshua Dallas, Oliver Kieran-Jones and Francis Fulton-Smith. The film was released direct-to-video on September 2, 2008 in the United States.

Premise
Alex North has been injected with a poison inside his body and has only 80 minutes to find $15,000 for his boss Lloyd if he wants to live. Now he must go through the whole night, searching for ways to make up that amount.

Cast
Gabriel Mann as Alex North
Josh Dallas as Floyd
Oliver Kieran-Jones as Lloyd
Natalia Avelon as Mona
Francis Fulton-Smith as Walter
Jack Murray as Black
Max Urlacher as Dr. Vincent North
Xenia Seeberg as Britt
Terry Cook as Mike
Niki Greb as Carmen
Alex Wedekind as Police Officer #1
Johannes Brandrup as Police Officer #2
Pierre Shrady as Jaguar Driver

Reception
Christopher Armstead called the film "trite".

References

External links

2008 films
2008 action thriller films
Direct-to-video action films
English-language German films
Direct-to-video thriller films
Films directed by Thomas Jahn
German action thriller films
2000s English-language films
2000s German films